Behesht Zahra Expressway is an expressway in southern Tehran. It connects Tehran to Behesht-e Zahra Cemetery.

Expressways in Tehran